The Amur goby  (Rhinogobius similis) is a species of fresh water goby native to Japan and China, and widely introduced in several central Asian countries, where it has been reported as negatively impacted the local ecology.  This species can reach   in total length.

References

Amur goby
Fish of East Asia
Freshwater fish of China
Freshwater fish of Japan
Fish described in 1859
Taxa named by Theodore Gill